The 1957–58 New York Rangers season was the franchise's 32nd season. The Rangers finished the regular season with 77 points, a total that placed them second in the NHL. New York qualified for the Stanley Cup playoffs, but lost to the Boston Bruins in the semi-finals.

Regular season

Record vs. opponents

Final standings

Schedule and results

|- align="center" bgcolor="#CCFFCC"
| 1 || 10 || @ Detroit Red Wings || 3–2 || 1–0–0
|- align="center" bgcolor="white"
| 2 || 12 || @ Montreal Canadiens || 2–2 || 1–0–1
|- align="center" bgcolor="#FFBBBB"
| 3 || 13 || @ Boston Bruins || 3–1 || 1–1–1
|- align="center" bgcolor="#FFBBBB"
| 4 || 16 || Boston Bruins || 6–2 || 1–2–1
|- align="center" bgcolor="#CCFFCC"
| 5 || 20 || Chicago Black Hawks || 6–1 || 2–2–1
|- align="center" bgcolor="#CCFFCC"
| 6 || 23 || Toronto Maple Leafs || 3–0 || 3–2–1
|- align="center" bgcolor="#FFBBBB"
| 7 || 26 || @ Toronto Maple Leafs || 3–0 || 3–3–1
|- align="center" bgcolor="#CCFFCC"
| 8 || 27 || Montreal Canadiens || 4–1 || 4–3–1
|- align="center" bgcolor="#FFBBBB"
| 9 || 30 || Detroit Red Wings || 4–0 || 4–4–1
|- align="center" bgcolor="#CCFFCC"
| 10 || 31 || @ Boston Bruins || 3–0 || 5–4–1
|-

|- align="center" bgcolor="#CCFFCC"
| 11 || 2 || Boston Bruins || 5–0 || 6–4–1
|- align="center" bgcolor="#CCFFCC"
| 12 || 3 || @ Chicago Black Hawks || 3–2 || 7–4–1
|- align="center" bgcolor="white"
| 13 || 5 || @ Detroit Red Wings || 1–1 || 7–4–2
|- align="center" bgcolor="#CCFFCC"
| 14 || 6 || @ Toronto Maple Leafs || 4–2 || 8–4–2
|- align="center" bgcolor="#FFBBBB"
| 15 || 9 || @ Chicago Black Hawks || 5–0 || 8–5–2
|- align="center" bgcolor="white"
| 16 || 13 || Chicago Black Hawks || 2–2 || 8–5–3
|- align="center" bgcolor="#CCFFCC"
| 17 || 16 || @ Montreal Canadiens || 4–2 || 9–5–3
|- align="center" bgcolor="#CCFFCC"
| 18 || 17 || Montreal Canadiens || 4–2 || 10–5–3
|- align="center" bgcolor="white"
| 19 || 20 || Detroit Red Wings || 1–1 || 10–5–4
|- align="center" bgcolor="#CCFFCC"
| 20 || 22 || @ Chicago Black Hawks || 4–2 || 11–5–4
|- align="center" bgcolor="#FFBBBB"
| 21 || 24 || Toronto Maple Leafs || 5–1 || 11–6–4
|- align="center" bgcolor="#FFBBBB"
| 22 || 27 || Boston Bruins || 5–2 || 11–7–4
|- align="center" bgcolor="#FFBBBB"
| 23 || 28 || @ Boston Bruins || 1–0 || 11–8–4
|- align="center" bgcolor="#FFBBBB"
| 24 || 30 || Detroit Red Wings || 3–1 || 11–9–4
|-

|- align="center" bgcolor="#CCFFCC"
| 25 || 1 || @ Detroit Red Wings || 5–1 || 12–9–4
|- align="center" bgcolor="#FFBBBB"
| 26 || 4 || Chicago Black Hawks || 2–0 || 12–10–4
|- align="center" bgcolor="white"
| 27 || 7 || @ Toronto Maple Leafs || 3–3 || 12–10–5
|- align="center" bgcolor="#FFBBBB"
| 28 || 8 || Toronto Maple Leafs || 2–1 || 12–11–5
|- align="center" bgcolor="#FFBBBB"
| 29 || 12 || @ Montreal Canadiens || 3–2 || 12–12–5
|- align="center" bgcolor="white"
| 30 || 14 || @ Detroit Red Wings || 4–4 || 12–12–6
|- align="center" bgcolor="#CCFFCC"
| 31 || 15 || Detroit Red Wings || 4–2 || 13–12–6
|- align="center" bgcolor="#CCFFCC"
| 32 || 18 || Montreal Canadiens || 5–4 || 14–12–6
|- align="center" bgcolor="white"
| 33 || 19 || @ Boston Bruins || 3–3 || 14–12–7
|- align="center" bgcolor="#CCFFCC"
| 34 || 21 || @ Montreal Canadiens || 4–2 || 15–12–7
|- align="center" bgcolor="#CCFFCC"
| 35 || 22 || Toronto Maple Leafs || 5–2 || 16–12–7
|- align="center" bgcolor="#FFBBBB"
| 36 || 25 || Chicago Black Hawks || 3–1 || 16–13–7
|- align="center" bgcolor="#FFBBBB"
| 37 || 28 || @ Toronto Maple Leafs || 6–1 || 16–14–7
|- align="center" bgcolor="#FFBBBB"
| 38 || 29 || Montreal Canadiens || 4–3 || 16–15–7
|-

|- align="center" bgcolor="#FFBBBB"
| 39 || 4 || Boston Bruins || 7–4 || 16–16–7
|- align="center" bgcolor="#FFBBBB"
| 40 || 5 || Montreal Canadiens || 4–0 || 16–17–7
|- align="center" bgcolor="white"
| 41 || 8 || Toronto Maple Leafs || 5–5 || 16–17–8
|- align="center" bgcolor="#FFBBBB"
| 42 || 11 || @ Montreal Canadiens || 9–3 || 16–18–8
|- align="center" bgcolor="#FFBBBB"
| 43 || 12 || Detroit Red Wings || 3–2 || 16–19–8
|- align="center" bgcolor="#CCFFCC"
| 44 || 16 || @ Boston Bruins || 3–2 || 17–19–8
|- align="center" bgcolor="#CCFFCC"
| 45 || 18 || @ Chicago Black Hawks || 3–2 || 18–19–8
|- align="center" bgcolor="#CCFFCC"
| 46 || 19 || @ Detroit Red Wings || 6–1 || 19–19–8
|- align="center" bgcolor="#FFBBBB"
| 47 || 25 || @ Toronto Maple Leafs || 7–1 || 19–20–8
|- align="center" bgcolor="#FFBBBB"
| 48 || 26 || @ Chicago Black Hawks || 4–3 || 19–21–8
|- align="center" bgcolor="white"
| 49 || 29 || Boston Bruins || 1–1 || 19–21–9
|-

|- align="center" bgcolor="#CCFFCC"
| 50 || 1 || Chicago Black Hawks || 3–2 || 20–21–9
|- align="center" bgcolor="#FFBBBB"
| 51 || 2 || @ Boston Bruins || 4–3 || 20–22–9
|- align="center" bgcolor="#CCFFCC"
| 52 || 8 || @ Detroit Red Wings || 5–2 || 21–22–9
|- align="center" bgcolor="#FFBBBB"
| 53 || 9 || Montreal Canadiens || 3–1 || 21–23–9
|- align="center" bgcolor="#CCFFCC"
| 54 || 14 || @ Chicago Black Hawks || 3–1 || 22–23–9
|- align="center" bgcolor="#CCFFCC"
| 55 || 16 || Boston Bruins || 3–2 || 23–23–9
|- align="center" bgcolor="#CCFFCC"
| 56 || 19 || Chicago Black Hawks || 3–2 || 24–23–9
|- align="center" bgcolor="white"
| 57 || 22 || @ Montreal Canadiens || 2–2 || 24–23–10
|- align="center" bgcolor="#CCFFCC"
| 58 || 23 || Toronto Maple Leafs || 4–2 || 25–23–10
|- align="center" bgcolor="#CCFFCC"
| 59 || 26 || Chicago Black Hawks || 4–3 || 26–23–10
|-

|- align="center" bgcolor="#CCFFCC"
| 60 || 1 || @ Toronto Maple Leafs || 5–4 || 27–23–10
|- align="center" bgcolor="white"
| 61 || 2 || Detroit Red Wings || 4–4 || 27–23–11
|- align="center" bgcolor="#CCFFCC"
| 62 || 8 || @ Montreal Canadiens || 3–2 || 28–23–11
|- align="center" bgcolor="#FFBBBB"
| 63 || 9 || Detroit Red Wings || 4–2 || 28–24–11
|- align="center" bgcolor="white"
| 64 || 11 || @ Detroit Red Wings || 2–2 || 28–24–12
|- align="center" bgcolor="#CCFFCC"
| 65 || 12 || @ Chicago Black Hawks || 3–2 || 29–24–12
|- align="center" bgcolor="#CCFFCC"
| 66 || 15 || @ Boston Bruins || 4–0 || 30–24–12
|- align="center" bgcolor="#FFBBBB"
| 67 || 16 || Montreal Canadiens || 3–2 || 30–25–12
|- align="center" bgcolor="white"
| 68 || 19 || Boston Bruins || 1–1 || 30–25–13
|- align="center" bgcolor="#CCFFCC"
| 69 || 22 || @ Toronto Maple Leafs || 7–0 || 31–25–13
|- align="center" bgcolor="#CCFFCC"
| 70 || 23 || Toronto Maple Leafs || 3–2 || 32–25–13
|-

Playoffs

Key:  Win  Loss

Player statistics
Skaters

Goaltenders

†Denotes player spent time with another team before joining Rangers. Stats reflect time with Rangers only.
‡Traded mid-season. Stats reflect time with Rangers only.

Awards and records

Transactions

See also
1957–58 NHL season

References

New York Rangers seasons
New York Rangers
New York Rangers
New York Rangers
New York Rangers
Madison Square Garden
1950s in Manhattan